The First Battle of Pocotaligo was a battle in the American Civil War fought on May 29, 1862 near Yemassee, South Carolina. The Union objective was to sever the Charleston and Savannah Railroad and thus isolate Charleston, South Carolina.

Battle
On May 28, 1862 a Union detachment from the 50th Pennsylvania Infantry, 8th Michigan Infantry, 79th New York Infantry and 1st Massachusetts Cavalry under Colonel Benjamin C. Christ left Beaufort, South Carolina to demonstrate against the Charleston and Savannah Railroad. The force marched toward Pocotaligo, driving back pickets along the way. Some severe fighting took place at Pocotaligo where much of the bridge had been removed. About 300 Union men were able to cross the creek and drive the Confederates into the woods. Since the damage to the bridge and action against the Confederate force was in line with the mission's objective, the Union force withdrew. The Union expedition lost 2 killed and 9 wounded. The Confederates lost 2 killed, 6 wounded and 1 missing.

References

Battles of the Eastern Theater of the American Civil War
1862 in the American Civil War
Battles of the American Civil War in South Carolina
1862 in South Carolina
Battles of the Lower Seaboard Theater and Gulf Approach of the American Civil War
Confederate victories of the American Civil War
Jasper County, South Carolina
History of Charleston, South Carolina
May 1862 events
19th-century in Charleston, South Carolina